The  (Asian Highway Network ) is an expressway in Japan, running from Kobe through Hiroshima along the Inland Sea and terminating in Yamaguchi Prefecture. The entire length of the expressway was opened in 1997. The main line has a total length of 405.6 kilometers.

List of interchanges and features 

 IC - interchange, SIC - smart interchange, JCT - junction, SA - service area, PA - parking area, BS - bus stop, TN - tunnel, TB - toll gate, BR - bridge
 Bus stops labeled "○" are currently in use; those marked "◆" are closed.

Main Route

Kimi Branch

Hayashima Branch

Ube-Shimonoseki Route

See also 
West Nippon Expressway Company

AH1
Expressways in Japan